ClapClapClap! (stylized as CLAPCLAPCLAP!) is the debut studio album by Filipino band IV of Spades. It was released on January 18, 2019 by Warner Music Philippines. The album features songs that were previously released as singles, namely "In My Prison", "Bata, Dahan-Dahan", "Take That Man", "Bawat Kaluluwa", and their fifth single "Come Inside of My Heart".

Background and recording 
IV of Spades is a funk-rock band from the Philippines. Formed in 2014, it consists of lead vocalist and bassist Zild Benitez, lead guitarist Blaster Silonga, and drummer Badjao de Castro. Unique Salonga, the band's original lead vocalist, left the band in April 2018 and pursued a solo career, after which Benitez took over singing duties. As the band announced Unique's departure and dispelled rumors of disbanding, they told fans on their Facebook page that they were working on their first full-length record.

Months prior to the album's release, the band issued several successful singles, including "Mundo", which still featured Unique as a vocalist.

According to an interview with Philippine magazine Chalk, the band members decided on recording the album as an overnight decision while recording "In My Prison". Recording and production commenced in August 2018 and lasted for four months.

Music and lyrics 
The album departs from the band's prior funk-rock style. CLAPCLAPCLAP! takes influence from various genres including alternative rock, electro pop, pop, indie pop, ballad, pop rock, and psychedelic rock. Three out of 15 of the album's tracks are written in Filipino, specifically "Bata, Dahan-Dahan!", "Bawat Kaluluwa", and "Dulo ng Hangganan". Its lyrical content explores themes of childhood, freedom, and relationships.

Release 
ClapClapClap! was released on January 18, 2019 on Spotify, Apple Music, and iTunes. Subsequently, on January 20, a music video for their fourth single "Bawat Kaluluwa"  was uploaded on the band's official YouTube page.

Track listing

Awards and nominations

See also
IV of Spades discography

References 

2019 debut albums
IV of Spades albums
Warner Music Philippines albums